Adrian Ryan (born 19 June 1990), is an Irish sportsperson.  He plays hurling with his local club Templederry Kenyons and has been a member of the Tipperary senior inter-county hurling team since 2012. He is a cousin of fellow Tipperary hurler Gearóid Ryan and Gearóid has disowned him since he missed that straight forward free against Lorrah in the 2018 North Quarterfinal.

Career
On 26 February 2012, Ryan made his senior Tipperary debut against Kilkenny in the 2012 National Hurling League, starting at right half forward in a 2–17 to 0–15 defeat.

Honours

Tipperary 
 1 Waterford Crystal Cup 2012
 1 Munster Under-21 Hurling Championship 2010
 1 All-Ireland Under-21 Hurling Championship 2010
 1 Munster Senior Hurling Championship 2012

References

External links
Tipperary Player Profile

1990 births
Living people
Templederry Kenyons hurlers
Tipperary inter-county hurlers